Maranthes corymbosa is a tree in the family Chrysobalanaceae. The specific epithet corymbosa is from the Greek meaning "cluster", referring to the clustered inflorescences.

Description
The smooth bark is grey-brown. The flowers are pink, tinged white. The wood is locally used in construction.

Distribution and habitat
Maranthes corymbosa grows naturally in Thailand, Malesia, the Solomon Islands, the Caroline Islands and Australia. It is also found in Panama. Its habitat is forests from sea-level to  altitude.

References

Chrysobalanaceae
Malpighiales of Australia
Trees of Thailand
Trees of Malesia
Trees of Papuasia
Flora of the Caroline Islands
Flora of the Northern Territory
Flora of Queensland
Plants described in 1825
Taxonomy articles created by Polbot